is a Japanese professional sumo wrestler from Fukushima. He made his debut in March 2017 and reached the top makuuchi division in November 2019. He wrestles for Arashio stable, where he is a stablemate of his older brothers Wakatakamoto and Wakamotoharu. His highest rank has been sekiwake. He has four special prizes for Technique. In March 2022 he won his first top division championship.

Family background
The three Onami brothers are the grandchildren of former komusubi Wakabayama.  They were given their shikona or sumo names by Arashio stable's head coach Ōyutaka, after the three sons of Mōri Motonari in the well-known Japanese parable "Lesson of the three arrows" – Takamoto, Motoharu, and Takakage. The eldest brother, Wakatakamoto, has a highest rank of makushita 7 and has been in sumo the longest, debuting in November 2009. Wakatakakage and Wakamotoharu are the 19th pair of brothers in sumo to both reach sekitori level.  Wakamotoharu is the second eldest and entered in November 2011, but did not make his jūryō debut until after Wakatakakage, in March 2019. On the January 2022 banzuke Wakamotoharu made his makuuchi division debut. Wakatakakage, the youngest brother, has had by far the quickest rise up the rankings of the three.

Career
He made his professional debut in March 2017, and because of his success in amateur sumo began as a sandanme tsukedashi entrant. He won the sandanme division championship in May 2017 with a perfect 7–0 record and also won the makushita division championship in January 2018 by the same score. He made his jūryō debut in May 2018, the second to do from Arashio stable after Sokokurai in 2010 and the first from Fukushima Prefecture since Sotairyu in 2009. He rose slowly up the jūryō division, winning promotion to the top makuuchi division after a 9–6 record at jūryō 3 in September 2019. Despite a poor 2–6 start to that tournament he won his final seven matches (including wins over top division veterans such as Toyonoshima and Kaisei) to secure his promotion. He was the third sandanme tsukedashi entrant to reach the top division after Yutakayama and Asanoyama.

Wakatakakage won his first four bouts in his top division debut in November 2019, but dislocated a joint in his right foot after landing awkwardly during his fourth day win over Terutsuyoshi and had to withdraw from the rest of the tournament. Back in jūryō he put together two consecutive winning records of 9–6 and 10–5 upon his return from injury to earn promotion back the top division for the (subsequently cancelled) May 2020 tournament at his highest rank to date of maegashira 14. In July 2020 he completed his first full tournament in makuuchi, posting a respectable 10 wins. In September he was on the leaderboard for much of the tournament, although he picked up his fourth loss to Mitakeumi on Day 14 and finished in a share of third place on 11–4.

On 31 December 2020 – 10 days before the start of the January 2021 basho - it was announced by the Sumo Association that Wakatakakage tested positive for COVID-19. The entire Arashio stable – along with the Miyagino, Tomozuna and Kokonoe stables – sat out the tournament. He returned in March and produced a 10–5 record, defeating two ōzeki and receiving the Technique Prize. He earned his second Technique Prize in May 2021 with a 9–6 record and was promoted to the san'yaku ranks for the first time as komusubi. He was the first from Arashio stable to reach the komusubi rank since its founding in 2002. 

After consecutive winning records at the top maegashira rank in November 2021 and January 2022, Wakatakakage was promoted to a career-best rank of sekiwake for the March 2022 tournament.
He followed up this sekiwake debut by winning his first makuuchi tournament after producing a 12-3 record and defeating co-leader Takayasu in a playoff, along with receiving his third Technique prize. This marked the first time in 86 years that a newly promoted sekiwake won the championship (after Futabayama in 1936), as well as the first time in 50 years that a wrestler from Fukushima Prefecture won the championship (after Tochiazuma in January 1972). Wakatakakage failed to defeat ōzeki Shōdai in the final regulation match (thus missing out on the Outstanding Performance Prize that he would have received with a 13–2 record),  but was guaranteed at least a playoff as Takayasu had lost his own match to Abi earlier in the day.

Wakatakakage followed up his tournament win with a 9–6 record in the May 2022 tournament. Maintaining his sekiwake rank in July, Wakatakakage recovered from losing his first three matches in September to produce an 11–4 record. He received his fourth Technique Prize on the final day. He achieved an 8–7 record in the November tournament to close out the year.

In the January 2023 tournament Wakatakakage earned a 9–6 record.

Fighting style
According to his Japan Sumo Association profile Wakatakakage prefers a migi-yotsu (right hand inside, left hand outside) grip on his opponent's mawashi. His most common winning kimarite are oshi-dashi (push out), yori-kiri (force out) and okuri-dashi (push out from behind). Wakatakakage is also known for his effective use of the ottsuke arm-blocking technique with his right arm, being able to employ it both as a defensive and offensive move.

Career record

See also
List of sumo tournament top division champions
List of active sumo wrestlers
Active special prize winners
Glossary of sumo terms
List of sekiwake

References

External links
 

1994 births
Living people
Japanese sumo wrestlers
Sumo people from Fukushima Prefecture
Sekiwake